The poleyn or genouillere was a component of Medieval and Renaissance armor that protected the knee.  During the transition from mail armor to plate armor, this was among the earliest plate components to develop.  They first appeared around 1230 and remained in use until 1650 when firearms made them obsolete.

The specifics of poleyn design varied considerably over that period. The earliest poleyns were strapped over mail chausses. Fourteenth century and early fifteenth century poleyns usually attached to padded leggings or plate cuisses. During the fifteenth century poleyns developed an articulated construction that attached to the cuisses and schynbalds or greaves. A characteristic of late fifteenth century Gothic plate armor was a projection that guarded the side of the knee.

Gallery

Citations

References

See also 
Gaiters
Knee pad

External links

 The Poleyn instructions for creating reproduction sixteenth century poleyns
 Leg Harness (1400 - 1620) description of historic developments in leg armor

Medieval armour
Western plate armour